Rui Pedro Teixeira Cardoso (born ) is a Portuguese futsal player who plays as a goalkeeper for Modicus Sandim and the Portuguese national futsal team.

References

External links

1993 births
Living people
Sportspeople from Porto
Futsal goalkeepers
Portuguese men's futsal players